Me. You. He. She is a 2018 Ukrainian romantic comedy directed by  Volodymyr Zelenskyy and David Dodson. The film stars Anastasiya Korotkaya and Volodymyr Zelenskyy. It was produced by the creative association Kvartal 95 Studio.

Plot
Maxim and Yana have been married for 10 years. Their relationship has become a union, love has become respect, and passion has become a duty. And when tempting prospects appear on the horizon, the couple decides to divorce. However, the court, not having heard weighty reasons for divorce, according to the legislation of Ukraine, gives the spouses a month for reconciliation. Husband and wife decide during this time to explore their most daring dreams and fantasies that they had refused themselves for ten years of marriage.

Cast
In the main roles were Yevhen Koshovy, Nastya Korotka, Nadia Dorofeeva and Volodymyr Zelenskyy. Further roles were cast with the actors Stas Baklan, Olga Sumska, Sergei Babkin, Yuri Tkach and Olga Polyakova.

Production
The film was originally shot in Russian and later dubbed into Ukrainian. 
During the premiere press conference of the producers, Volodymyr Zelenskyy assured journalists that "initially the script of the film was written in Ukrainian" and only "later it had to be translated into Russian for Lithuanian actress Agne Grudite who was to play the lead role of Yana and who did not speak Ukrainian". At the last minute, Grudite refused to participate in the film. The role of Yana was then cast with Ukrainian actress Anastasiya Korotkaya, but the movie was still produced in Russian. Filming took place in late summer 2018 in the Ukrainian cities of Kyiv and Lviv.

Budget 
The project project became one of the winners of the 10th State Cinema Competition. The total cost of the film was set at ₴36.9 million (approx. US$1.3 million). The film was shot with the support of the State Cinema and 49% of the film's budget was financed by the state.

Release 

The film premiered in Ukraine on December 27, 2018, and achieved a record in the collection of Ukrainian films, raising more than ₴71 million (approx. US$2.5 million). The film was watched by almost 800,000 viewers and was also released abroad. In Kazakhstan the tape was released on January 10, 2019, in Latvia on January 11, 2019, under the title "Es, tu, viņš, viņa", in Lithuania on January 11, 2019, under the title "Aš, tu, jis ir ji" and in Estonia on January 18, 2019, under the title "Lahuta, et armastada".

In March 2019, the film became available with Ukrainian dubbing on the VOD platform Megogo. Later, on April 17, the premiere of the film with Ukrainian dubbing took place on television on the 1 + 1 TV channel. After that, on April 18, 2019, the creators released a film with Ukrainian dubbing in the public domain on the platform "1 + 1 video".

Reviews 
The film received negative reviews from some Ukrainian viewers and critics due to the fact that, contrary to the promises of the head of Kvartal 95 Studio, Volodymyr Zelenskyy, the film was shot not in Ukrainian but in Russian, and dubbed into Ukrainian only in post-production.

References

External links 

 Kino Teatr - "Me, You, He, She"
 Studio Kvartal 95 - "Me, You, He, She"
 
 YouTube - Official trailer of "Я, Ти, Він, Вона"

2018 films
2010s Russian-language films
Russian-language Ukrainian films
2018 romantic comedy films
Ukrainian romantic comedy films
Volodymyr Zelenskyy films